Harsimus (also known as Harsimus Cove) is a neighborhood within Downtown Jersey City, Hudson County, New Jersey, United States. The neighborhood stretches from the Harsimus Stem Embankment (the Sixth Street Embankment) on the north to Christopher Columbus Drive on the south between Coles Street and Grove Street or more broadly, to Marin Boulevard. It borders the neighborhoods of Hamilton Park to the north, Van Vorst Park to the south, the Village to the west, and the Powerhouse Arts District to the east. Newark Avenue has traditionally been its main street. The name is from the Lenape, used by the Hackensack Indians who inhabited the region  and could be translated as Crow’s Marsh. From many years, the neighborhood was part of  the "Horseshoe", a political delineation created by its position between the converging rail lines and political gerrymandering.

Early settlement
Harsimus is a derivative of a Lenape phrase, possibly meaning Crow's Marsh. Spellings include: Aharsimus, Ahasimus, Hasymes, Haassemus, Hahassemes, Hasimus, Horseemes, Hasseme, Horsimus  In current Lenape, ahas means "crow".

In 1629, the Dutchman Michael Reyniersz Pauw obtained a patent for all the land in what would become Hudson County, naming it Pavonia. Unable to fulfill a patroon charter provision that he set up a plantation with fifty permanent settlers, the Dutch West India Company sold a part to his superintendent, who had built a homestead in 1634 and was the first of many Van Vorsts to play important roles in the development of the city. A family homestead built in 1647 was demolished in 1967. Conflict with Native Americans compromised the settlement 1643, which continued to grow after the 1645 treaty ending Kieft's War. Again in 1655, the area was attacked in a conflict called the Peach Tree War. In 1660, it came under the jurisdiction of Bergen, New Netherland the main village of which was located at Bergen Square.

Once the area was ceded to the British after the surrender of Fort Amsterdam, New York claimed ownership to the high waterline along the west bank of the Hudson River and that any pier built there was under its jurisdiction, thus stifling development which would compete with the burgeoning New York City. Paulus Hook was the first to urbanize, and The City of Jersey was incorporated in various forms in 1820, 1829, and again in 1838. John Coles, a merchant from New York, was among the first to expand into Harsimus. The Supreme Court settled the matter of jurisdiction in the 1830s, creating a border mid-river. Harsimus grew with shipping along shoreline and residences farther inland. The short-lived Van Vorst Township later merged with its neighbor. Much of the housing stock from the maritime era is still intact. Many of the streets in the gridiron laid at the time have been renamed over the years. Moving away from the river they were originally called Hudson, River, Kelso, and Barnum. Provost and others to the west have stayed the same.

Rise of the railroad and Hague
Harsimus was transformed by the development of the railroad industry. By 1870 much of the estuary flood zone was land-filled for the development of railyards, extending a quarter mile from Henderson Street. Three elevated right of ways were built: one from the Bergen Arches to the Erie Railroad Pavonia Terminal, the Harsimus Stem Embankment at 6th  Street for the Pennsylvania Railroad (PRR), and another for its Jersey City Branch along Railroad Avenue (now Columbus Drive) to Exchange Place. The embankments and elevated lines separated adjoining neighborhoods. A small slip was created and still is called Harsimus Cove. Huge stockyards dominated the waterfront between the train terminals.

Harsimus' isolation was codified with gerrymandering, forming a horseshoe and creating a new nickname. The community consisted of Catholic immigrants, many of them Irish, who worked on the railroad. Infuxes of Ellis Island immigrants swelled the population. A vestige of the Slavic character of the area remains at the Ukrainian National Home. To diminish the Democratic power base, Republican power brokers redrew the  voting district to consist solely of the Horseshoe so that they may protect other seats from Democratic threat. In the 1910s the Horseshoe power base produced the infamous Mayor Frank Hague who dominated the Hudson County political machine and influenced city, county, state, and federal politics for most of the first half of the 20th century. In 1941 a large fire struck the Horseshoe waterfront.

Post industrial era

In the late 1950s, container shipping in Port Newark supplanted railroad ports along waterfront, which by the 1970s were abandoned, leading to a decline in population and economic activity. Urban renewal projects brought slum clearance of tenements along Grove Street  as well as the removal of the PRR elevated rail right of way. Middle, low income, and senior housing projects were developed. A section of Grove Street was renamed Manila Avenue in recognition of the city's resident Overseas Filipinos. Henderson Street became Marin Boulevard for the first governor of Puerto Rico Luis Muñoz Marín  to reflect the influx of Puerto Rican and Filipino residents. Railroad Avenue  is now Columbus Drive, acknowledging the still large Italian population.

The renewal did not affect the 19th century blocks which were not demolished. A historic preservation movement and real estate reinvestment led to Harsimus's designation as a Historic District in 1987. Convenience to mass transit and relatively affordable rents attracted an artistic community, some of whom converted buildings to live/work spaces. Zoning in the form of "WALDO" (or Work and Live District Overlay) were unsuccessful in preserving and stimulating the creation of an arts district within the area where large warehouses still remained, and have given way the Powerhouse Arts District and the construction of residential highrises.

East of the neighborhood, the LeFrak Organization obtained title to most of the disused Erie-Lackawanna land and began the development of Newport, centered around the Port Authority Trans Hudson (PATH) Newport Station in the 1980s. To the south, the PRR abattoir were also acquired. Development plans did not include extending the 19th century urban grid to the waterfront, but the construction of large parking decks at the former and strip mall at the latter. The first segment of the Hudson-Bergen Light Rail opened in 2002, including the Harsimus Cove Station nearby the landmark Hudson and Manhattan Railroad Powerhouse.

Grove Pointe, a residential complex at 100 and 102 Christopher Columbus Drive, the "30-story tiered brick-and-stone structure with abundant glass" was designed by DeWitt Tishman Architects and built by Kushner Real Estate Group.

See also
New Netherland
Communipaw
Harsimus Branch
Horseshoe, Jersey City
Jersey City and Harsimus Cemetery
List of Registered Historic Places in Hudson County, New Jersey
Historic Districts in Hudson County, New Jersey
New Netherland settlements
English Neighborhood
Achter Col
Vriessendael
Van Vorst Township
St. Mary High School (Jersey City, New Jersey)

References

History of Jersey City, New Jersey
Neighborhoods in Jersey City, New Jersey
New Netherland
Historic towns of Hudson County, New Jersey
Historic districts in Hudson County, New Jersey
Beaux-Arts architecture in New Jersey
Houses on the National Register of Historic Places in New Jersey
National Register of Historic Places in Hudson County, New Jersey
Houses in Hudson County, New Jersey
New Jersey Register of Historic Places
17th-century establishments in New Jersey